"Bullet Holes" is the lead single from The Kingdom, the eighth studio album by English rock band Bush. It featured in the 2019 action film John Wick: Chapter 3 - Parabellum.

Content

Musical style 
In allusion to the song's musical content, Rolling Stone detailed "echoy blues guitar riffs" and "seething bass", descending into a "punk" style".

A strong resemblance between the style of "Bullet Holes" and U2's "Bullet the Blue Sky" has been remarked upon.

Music video 
The music video for "Bullet Holes" was directed by Jesse Davey.

Chart

References

2019 singles
British punk rock songs
Bush (British band) songs
2019 songs
Songs written by Gavin Rossdale